Twin Peaks is a summit in the U.S. state of Nevada.

Twin Peaks was descriptively named.

References

Mountains of Churchill County, Nevada